Masaan (also known as Fly Away Solo in English) is a 2015 Indian Hindi-language independent drama film and starring Richa Chadda and Vicky Kaushal in lead roles. It is Kaushal's debut Hindi film, and is also the directorial debut of Neeraj Ghaywan. It is an Indo-French co-production produced by Drishyam Films, Macassar Productions, Phantom Films, Sikhya Entertainment, Arte France Cinema and Pathé Productions.

The film was screened in the Un Certain Regard section at the 2015 Cannes Film Festival winning two awards. it was screened at the inaugural New York Dalit Film and Cultural Festival in 2019 along with Pariyerum Perumal (2018), Kaala (2018) and Fandry (2013). Since its release in 2015, the film has gone on to achieve cult status.

Plot
Masaan tracks the lives of two young people in Varanasi, India.

Devi Pathak, a trainer at a coaching computer center and her student, Piyush Aggarwal, are caught having sex in a hotel room by policemen who had been tipped off by the hotel staff. Inspector Mishra records the barely clad Devi on his mobile phone. Piyush locks himself in the bathroom and commits suicide by slitting his wrists. Pathak is tempted by a betting game, where people bet on small boys to dive and collect the maximum number of coins from the Ganges riverbed within a specified time. He had previously barred Jhonta, a boy who works at his shop, from participating in the diving game but relents after Mishra's threats increase. Devi cycles through jobs at different coaching centers, facing harassment by colleagues as the news of her affair spreads. She eventually gets a temporary government job in Indian Railways, but tells her father she wishes to leave Varanasi to study at Allahabad University as soon as Mishra's bribe is paid in full.

Deepak Kumar (Vicky Kaushal) is the youngest of a Dom family working in the cremation ghats. He is a civil engineering student at a polytechnic college. Deepak's father doesn't want to see his sons continue the hereditary job. Deepak falls in love with Shaalu Gupta (Shweta Tripathi), a high caste Hindu girl. They start meeting each other and during a trip to Allahabad on the banks of the Ganges, they share an intimate moment. Back in Varanasi, Deepak tells her about his caste and the work he does burning corpses. Shaalu doesn't mind and says that she is ready to run away with him if her parents refuse. She asks him to focus on his exams and getting a good job.

On a pilgrimage trip with her family, Shaalu dies in a bus accident. Her body with those of other victims ends up at the same cremation ground where Deepak's family works. Deepak is devastated on seeing her dead body. He eventually overcomes his grief and is hired by Indian Railways as an engineer in Allahabad.

In a special diving competition, Pathak bets Rs 10000, a significant portion of his remaining savings, on Jhonta. Jhonta drowns and is taken to a hospital by Vidyadhar, who vows to never let the boy participate in the diving competition again. As Jhonta regains consciousness, he is shown to have found Shaalu's ring, which had been thrown into the Ganga by Deepak in a fit of grief. Jhonta gives it to Vidyadhar, who sells the ring to fully pay off Inspector Mishra.

Before leaving Varanasi, Devi visits Piyush's family, where his father shouts at and slaps her away. She comes to the banks of the Ganges to immerse the gift Piyush had given her on that fateful day in the hotel. Deepak, who is by the bank, notices her crying and offers her water to drink. A boatman beckons, offering both of them a ride towards Sangam. They both board the boat and strike up a conversation.

Themes 
Masaan, a film about characters locked in the cycle of pain and salvation, depicts the existential problem expressed in the above phrase. While Varun Grover's screenplay has a poetic-realism feel to it, the film's mise-en-scene and other filmic aspects as sound, cinematography, and even casting choices assist to accentuate the film's key themes. 'Masaan,' a story about characters afflicted by various disasters, thematically explores concerns about suffering, agony, and redemption. The title, which means crematorium, and the setting hint to the film's themes of entropy, destruction, and resurrection. Masaan is set in Varanasi, the historic centre of spirituality and redemption, which is portrayed as a storehouse of antiquated values and a boiling pot of unsatisfied ambitions. Two paths are intertwined, one in sorrow and the other in optimism. Devi (Richa Chadha) has an inappropriate relationship with her lover, which leads to blackmail and harassment from a police officer (Bhagwan Tiwari) as well as the quiet fury of her father Pathak (Sanjay Mishra). Even as Devi retreats into a catatonic shell, Pathak takes tiny and major risks to maintain his honour, aided by the energetic Jhonta (Nikhil Sahni), a child who works for him.

Meanwhile, Deepak (Vicky Kaushal) has begun his trek out of the Varanasi cremation grounds, a caste-ordained purgatory where his Dom family has been sweeping embers over remains for years.

Cast
 Richa Chadda as Devi Pathak
 Vicky Kaushal as Deepak Kumar
 Shweta Tripathi as Shaalu Gupta
 Sanjay Mishra as Vidyadhar Pathak
 Pankaj Tripathi as Sadhya
 Bhagwan Tiwari as Inspector Mishra
 Nikhil Sahni as Jhonta
 Vineet Kumar as Dom Raja
 Shree Dhar Dubey as KK
 Satya Kam Anand as Vikram Mallah
 Niharica Raizada in a special appearance

Soundtrack

The music for Masaan's songs was composed by Indian Ocean and the lyrics were written by Varun Grover. The album received positive reviews from critics.

The film contains various examples of Urdu & Hindi poetry at different junctures including works by Akbar Allahabadi, Basheer Badr, Brij Narayan Chakbast, Mirza Ghalib, Uday Prakash and Dushyant Kumar. Explaining this as a conscious tribute, the film's lyricist Varun Grover explained that he wanted to show Shaalu (played by Shweta Tripathi) as a person whose hobby is to read Hindi poetry and shaayari, as this is a common hobby of millennial and generation x youngsters in Northern India, especially when in love, but this aspect is rarely shown in Hindi films.

The song ("Tu Kisi Rail Si") is based on the work of the poet Dushyant Kumar.

Reception

Critical response
Masaan received overwhelming critical acclaim from the mainstream media. On the review aggregator website Rotten Tomatoes, the film holds an approval rating of 92% based on 13 reviews, with an average rating of 7.30/10.

Calling it "a very engaging debut" by Neeraj Ghaywan, Allan Hunter in Screen Daily wrote, "Vicky Kaushal brings a gauche charm to Deepak and Richa Chadda invests the long suffering Devi with a weary, unwavering determination to move forward. Cinematographer Avinash Arun Dhaware captures some fantastic images of Banares that convey the bustling spirit of the city from the brightly lit street markets to the flurry of sparks that dot the night sky from the funeral pyres." Deborah Young writing in The Hollywood Reporter described the film as "a classically poignant drama of star-crossed love" and "part of the new generation of indie films whose clear intent is to set ablaze a hidebound society’s constrictions on personal liberty." Jay Weissberg in his review for the Variety magazine, however, found it "a heartfelt yet overambitious tale of class and gender inequality" with the director failing to find "ways to overcome script and editing weaknesses, resulting in a disappointing drama."

Senior journalist Shekhar Gupta wrote in his National Interest column that Masaan left a deep impression on him, "get[ting] the pulse of small-town India as no other I have seen." The director has woven Ganga intimately into Varun Grover's tight screenplay, Gayatri Gauri wrote in First Post adding "Several crucial moments swirl around the Ganga, beautifully shot without succumbing to visual exotica, and after you leave the cinema, they linger in your memory, like the flames dying slowly in the cremation grounds where so much of Masaan unfurls."

Shubra Gupta wrote in The Indian Express, "Masaan is imbued with a sense of place and time, poetry and lyricism, and it captures the essence of Banaras, constant-yet-changeable, with felicity and feel. It also announces the arrival of new talents in its writer and director: Grover’s story is eminently worth telling, and Ghaywan tells it beautifully." "Ghaywan, in his very first film, creates a deeply affecting world that devastates and uplifts at the same time, and that becomes a part of your world long after the film is over," wrote Nikhil Taneja reviewing the film for The Huffington Post.

Controversy
The film released for streaming on Hotstar was found to be heavily censored which caused a controversy involving the streaming platform and the producers of the film.

Accolades

References

External links

2015 films
2015 drama films
2015 directorial debut films
2010s Hindi-language films
Indian drama films
French drama films
Films set in Uttar Pradesh
Best Debut Feature Film of a Director National Film Award winners
Ghalib
Hindi-language drama films
Pathé films
Films about the caste system in India
2010s French films